\

Pauline is an opera in four acts with music by the British composer Frederic H. Cowen to a libretto by Henry Hersee after the 1838 play The Lady of Lyons by Edward Bulwer-Lytton, first performed by the Carl Rosa Opera Company on 22 September 1876 at the Lyceum Theatre, London.

References

Further reading 
 Cowen, F. H., My Art and My Friends, London, Arnold, 1913
 Sadie, S. (ed.) (1980) The New Grove Dictionary of Music and Musicians, 5.
 Burton, N., "Pauline" in Grove Music Online (ed. Macy, L.)
 Parker, C. J. (2007), unpublished PhD thesis (University of Durham, UK): The Music of Sir Frederic Hymen Cowen (1852–1935): a Critical Study.

External links

English-language operas
Operas
1876 operas
Operas by Frederic H. Cowen
Operas based on works by Edward Bulwer-Lytton
Operas based on plays